Hadrosaurus is a genus of hadrosaurid ornithopod dinosaurs that lived in North America during the Late Cretaceous Period in what is now the Woodbury Formation about 80 million to 78 million years ago. The holotype specimen was found in fluvial marine sedimentation, meaning that the corpse of the animal was transported by a river and washed out to sea.

Most of the preserved elements are very robust, unusual traits in hadrosaurs. Hadrosaurus were ponderously-built animals equipped with keratinous beaks for cropping foliage and a specialized and complex dentition for food processing.

Hadrosaurus foulkii, the only species in this genus, is known from a single specimen consisting of much of the skeleton and parts of the skull. The specimen was collected in 1858 from the Woodbury Formation in New Jersey, US, representing the first dinosaur species known from more than isolated teeth to be identified in North America. Using radiometric dating of bivalve shells from the same formation, the sedimentary rocks where the Hadrosaurus fossil was found have been dated at some time between 80.5 and 78.5 million years ago. In 1858, the only known specimen became the first-ever dinosaur skeleton to be mounted. In 1991, H. foulkii became the official state dinosaur of New Jersey.

History of discovery
 

In 1838, John Estaugh Hopkins was digging in a marl pit (on a small tributary of the Cooper River in Haddonfield, New Jersey, and part of the Campanian-age Woodbury Formation) when he uncovered large bones. He put them on display at his home, also in Haddonfield. In 1858, the bones sparked the interest of a visitor, William Parker Foulke, who dug out the full skeleton from the marl pit in the same year. The excavation site, known as the Hadrosaurus foulkii Leidy site, is now a National Historic Landmark.

Foulke contacted paleontologist Joseph Leidy, and together they recovered eight teeth from the maxillar and dentary areas, dental battery fragments, left maxilla fragments, three partial dorsal vertebrae, 13 caudal centra, including an almost complete middle caudal vertebra. Other fragments included a partial right coracoid, left humerus, left radius, left ulna, left ilium, right ischium, right partial pubis, the left hindlimb composed by the femur, tibia, fibula with metatarsals II and IV and the first pedal phalanx from the third digit. Foulke and Leidy studied the fossils together and, in 1858, Leidy formally described and named Hadrosaurus foulkii in honor of his collaborator. The name was an additional play on words by Leidy since it translates from Greek as Foulke’s big lizard.

Leidy recognized that the bones were from a dinosaur because of their similarity to those of Iguanodon, discovered in England some decades before but, at the time, the skeleton of Hadrosaurus was one of the most complete dinosaur skeletons known. Leidy's monograph Cretaceous Reptiles of the United States, describing Hadrosaurus more completely, and with illustrations, was written in 1860, but the American Civil War delayed its publication until 1865.

Leidy reconstructed Hadrosaurus as a biped, in contrast to the view at the time that such dinosaurs were quadrupedal. The entire skeleton was completely assembled in 1868 by a team including English sculptor and naturalist Benjamin Waterhouse Hawkins and was put on display at Philadelphia Academy of Natural Sciences. It was the first-ever mounted dinosaur skeleton. When the skeleton was first put together, it was displayed with a plaster skull sculpted by Hawkins. Many other artists have recreated Hadrosaurus with skulls from other, related species such as Gryposaurus and Brachylophosaurus. A statue of Hadrosaurus, sculpted by Haddonfield resident John Giannotti, now stands in the center of the town of Haddonfield, commemorating its discovery there. Thanks to Joyce Berry and her 4th grade classes (1988–1991) at Strawbridge Elementary School in Haddon Twp, New Jersey, the Hadrosaurus was named the state dinosaur of New Jersey in 1991. It is one of the most celebrated dinosaurs ever and is of great historic importance. The skeleton is usually kept out of sight in the Academy's collections. However, from November 22, 2008, to April 19, 2009, a fully assembled cast of the skeleton, and an exhibit about the science and culture surrounding the dinosaur's discovery, was open to the public.

Description
 
According to Prieto-Márquez, Hadrosaurus can be distinguished in having a shortened pectoral crest that is slightly over 40% of the total humeral length, a deltopectoral crest that is developed from the humeral shaft causing the laterodistal border to display a broad lateral facet, a lower greatest point of the supraacetabular crest located above lateral edge from the rear to the bottom on the posterior tuberosity of the ischial peduncle of the ilium, a shortened supraacetabular crest from the front to the rear with its breadth being half the length of the middle iliac plate.

As in most hadrosaurs, the forelimbs were not as heavily built as the hindlimbs, but were long enough to be used in standing or movement. Most of the preserved elements feature a marked robust composition with the fibula being one of the most robust among hadrosaurs.

Classification

Despite the fact that the family Hadrosauridae has Hadrosaurus as its type genus, the skeleton lacks a skull and was long viewed as too incomplete to compare to other hadrosaurs for classification purposes, leading most scientists to consider it a nomen dubium, or dubious name. However, a re-evaluation of the fossil material in 2011 noted several distinct characteristics of the skeleton that could allow the genus Hadrosaurus and species H. foulkii to remain in use as valid taxa.

Hadrosaurus has also traditionally served as the basis for a large subfamily called Hadrosaurinae, which was seen as a group of largely crestless hadrosaurs related to the crested subfamily Lambeosaurinae. However, the changing view of Hadrosaurus classification in relation to other hadrosaurs has led some scientists to rename these subfamilies. In a 2008 study, Hadrosaurus was found to be more primitive than either lambeosaurines or other "hadrosaurines", and not a particularly close relative of classic "hadrosaurines" such as Edmontosaurus and Saurolophus. As a result of this, the name Hadrosaurinae was restricted to Hadrosaurus alone, and the subfamily comprising the traditional "hadrosaurines" was renamed the Saurolophinae.

Below is a simplified cladogram recovered by Ramírez-Velasco et al. in 2012 in their description of Huehuecanauhtlus. This topology was recovered using an extensive sampling of 60 hadrosauroid species, and two outgroup taxa, which were scored based on 287 morphological traits, and included data from two recent redescriptions of Hadrosaurus by Prieto-Márquez et al. (2006) and Prieto-Márquez (2011).

Paleobiology

In 2003, Rothschild and colleagues performed a study looking for epidemiology of tumors in dinosaurs. Evidence of tumors, including hemangiomas, desmoplastic fibroma, metastatic cancer, and osteoblastoma were discovered in specimens of Hadrosaurus by analyzing dinosaur vertebrae using computerized tomography and fluoroscope screening. Several other hadrosaurids, including Brachylophosaurus, Edmontosaurus, and Gilmoreosaurus, also tested positive. Although more than 10000 fossils were examined in this manner, the tumors were limited to Hadrosaurus and other hadrosaurs. The tumors were only found on caudal vertebrae and they may have been caused by environmental factors or genetic inheritance.

Paleoecology
The holotype of Hadrosaurus was found in marine sediments, which suggests the skeleton was transported by a river and then deposited in the Cretaceous sea. The Hadrosaurus remains all persist to the Woodbury Formation. Through the radiometric dating of bivalve shells known from the formation, the sedimentary rocks where the holotype specimen of Hadrosaurus was found have been dated from 80.5 million to 78.5 million years ago.

References

External links

Hadrosaur mummy
The discovery of H. foulkii
Hadrosaurids on UCMP
Hadrosaurus skeletal diagram
New Jersey State Museum website
Joseph Leidy and Hadrodaurus foulkii at The Academy of Natural Sciences
Hadrosaurus foulkii exhibit at The Academy of Natural Sciences

Late Cretaceous dinosaurs of North America
Hadrosaurs
Haddonfield, New Jersey
Natural history of New Jersey
Fossil taxa described in 1858
Taxa named by Joseph Leidy
Paleontology in New Jersey
Campanian genus first appearances
Campanian genus extinctions
Symbols of New Jersey
Ornithischian genera